Colby Joseph Armstrong (born November 23, 1982) is a Canadian former professional ice hockey player who played in the National Hockey League (NHL) for the Pittsburgh Penguins, Atlanta Thrashers, Toronto Maple Leafs and Montreal Canadiens in a 9-year career.  he serves as an NHL analyst for Sportsnet. Armstrong's younger brother Riley briefly played in the NHL with the San Jose Sharks.

Early life
Armstrong was born in Lloydminster, Saskatchewan, but grew up in Saskatoon. His father worked for the City of Saskatoon and his mother operates a skating school in Saskatoon. He has an older sister, Tiffany, and a younger brother, Riley. He attended St. Joseph High School in Saskatoon.

Hockey career

Junior hockey
Armstrong played his minor hockey with the Saskatoon Redwings and Saskatoon Blazers. He later played major junior hockey with the Red Deer Rebels of the Western Hockey League (WHL) beginning in 1999. In his second year with the Rebels, the team won the 2000–01 WHL championship. This allowed the Rebels to play for the Memorial Cup as the best junior hockey team in Canada. The tournament was held in Regina, Saskatchewan. The Rebels won the cup in overtime in the final with Armstrong as their captain. He played one more year with Rebels and finished his major junior career with 185 points in 205 games.

Professional hockey
Armstrong was drafted by the Pittsburgh Penguins in the first round of the 2001 NHL Entry Draft as the 21st pick overall. He was assigned to the Penguins' American Hockey League affiliate, Wilkes-Barre/Scranton Penguins beginning in the 2002–03 season. In the 2005–06 season, Armstrong made his NHL debut, and had a superb rookie season, in which he played 47 games and tallied 40 points (16 goals and 24 assists). Armstrong had three overtime goals for the Penguins in the 2006–07 season in which he accumulated 12 goals and 34 points. The Penguins and Armstrong avoided an arbitration hearing in the 2006–07 off-season by re-signing him to two-year, $2.2 million contract. Armstrong became very close friends with teammate Sidney Crosby while playing for the Penguins. On January 1, 2008, Armstrong scored the first ever outdoor Winter Classic goal in the inaugural event. 

Pittsburgh traded Armstrong on February 26, 2008, to the Atlanta Thrashers, alongside Angelo Esposito, Erik Christensen and a first-round draft pick in the 2008 NHL Entry Draft, in exchange for Marián Hossa and Pascal Dupuis. He then scored 11 points in 18 games to finish out the 2007–08 season with Atlanta. In the 2008–09 season, Armstrong played in all 82 games, matching his career high of 40 points. On July 16, 2009, Armstrong re-signed with the Thrashers to a one-year, $2.4 million contract. He served as one of the team's alternate captains during the 2009–10 season. He was also suspended for two games in April for an illegal hit on Mathieu Perreault of the Washington Capitals. He finished the season with 15 goals and 29 points in 79 games.

On July 1, 2010, Armstrong signed as an unrestricted free agent with the Toronto Maple Leafs on a three-year, $9 million contract. With his first two seasons largely affected by injury and inconsistent play, on June 30, 2012, he was bought-out by the Maple Leafs from his final season of his contract. He played in 79 games over the two years, registering 9 goals and 26 points. He was named an alternate captain by the Maple Leafs during his time with them.

With the opening of free agency the next day, July 1, 2012, Armstrong signed a one-year, $1 million contract with the Montreal Canadiens.  During the lock-out-shortened 2012–13 season, he signed to play with the Utah Grizzlies, where his brother Riley was playing at the time. After the season resumed, Armstrong suffered another major injury in an April game versus the Carolina Hurricanes. He finished the season contributing only 5 points in 37 games.

On July 27, 2013, Armstrong left the NHL as a free agent and signed his only European contract with the Växjö Lakers of the Swedish Hockey League, playing one season.

International play

Armstrong was a member of Canada's 2007 IIHF World Championship-winning team. His only goal of the tournament was the game-winning goal in the gold medal game against Finland in Moscow, which Canada won 4–2. He also played in the 2009 IIHF World Championship for Team Canada where they won the silver medal after losing to Russia 2–1 in the final.

Broadcasting career
Rogers Media hired Armstrong as an analyst for Sportsnet's national coverage of the NHL starting in the 2014–15 season.  Since 2016, he has also been an analyst of Pittsburgh Penguins games for the AT&T SportsNet Pittsburgh post-game broadcast crew  and games on TNT since 2022.

In 2019, Armstrong was in training to appear on the CBC reality TV show Battle of the Blades. However, he was injured during training and instead appeared on the show as one of the judges.

Career statistics

Regular season and playoffs

International

References

External links

Colby Armstrong on Twitter

1982 births
Living people
Atlanta Thrashers players
Canadian expatriate ice hockey players in Sweden
Canadian expatriate ice hockey players in the United States
Canadian ice hockey right wingers
Ice hockey people from Saskatchewan
Montreal Canadiens players
National Hockey League first-round draft picks
Pittsburgh Penguins draft picks
Pittsburgh Penguins players
Red Deer Rebels players
Sportspeople from Lloydminster
Sportspeople from Saskatoon
Toronto Maple Leafs players
Växjö Lakers players
Wilkes-Barre/Scranton Penguins players